Ramon, officially the Municipality of Ramon, is a 2nd class municipality in the province of Isabela, Philippines. According to the 2020 census, it has a population of 56,523 people.

The municipality of Ramon has a semi-radial but more defined linear development along the national road from Santiago City in the south to San Mateo towards the north. With the completion of the Magat River Multi-purpose high dam at Aguinaldo, near the Isabela-Ifugao provincial boundary, trend of expansion has deviated westward.

Etymology
The municipality was named in honor of Don Ramon Elento, a noble local who initiated a local petition to separate from then Santiago municipality. Contrary to popular belief, it was not named after the late President Ramon Magsaysay. Magsaysay municipality was chartered June 22, 1957, and was renamed to Delfin Albano on November 14, 1982.

History
In the middle of the twenties (1925-1926) when the San Jose–Santa Fe national road opened, Ilocano migrants from the Central Plain of Luzon like Tarlac, Pangasinan, and Nueva Ecija, arrived in bull carts to settle on this vast area covered with weeds called “samon” as homesteaders.  As required by statutes, these people stayed right on their  farms to clear the lot in order call it their own.  The place was a part of Buenavista, the oldest barrio of Santiago, Isabela.  For more than ten long years amidst hardships and sufferings due to malaria disease and unfavorable weather conditions, the pioneers labored to convert their homestead into a productive farm with palay as their main crop.

At the latter part of the thirties (1937), the Santiago–Tuguegarao Road via Mallig Plains was opened and more immigrants came to farm in the place.

The completion of the Maris Dam at Ambatali in 1957 attracted more migrants to farm at the irrigated areas of Bugallon.  Along with the Ilocano arrivals were few Tagalogs, Pangasinenses, and many others.

The municipality of Ramon was created on June 18, 1961, by virtue of Republic Act No. 3320 sponsored by the then Congressman Delfin Albano of the then lone district of Isabela. On November 12, 1963, the first set of local officials were elected with Angelino F. Vizcarra as Municipal Mayor.

The original seat of government was first conceived to be established 500 meters north of Barangay Burgos.  However, the local officials decided to temporarily locate the site at Bugallon which eventually became the permanent site by virtue of Republic Act No. 11354, upon which a two-storey Municipal Hall was built on December 8, 1968.

The municipality was originally classified as a seventh class municipality at the time of its inauguration on January 1, 1964.  Ramon had 12 original barangays carved out from the municipalities of San Mateo and Santiago.  In 1966, another barangay was annexed from the municipality of Echague.  Later, by virtue of the revised Barangay Charter or Republic Act. No. 3590, six additional barangays were created.

The rural Electrification Program of ISELCO I was completed in the later part of the seventies (1976–77).

And, with the completion of the Magat High Dam in 1983, more areas were converted into irrigated rice lands which attracted more and more people from all places to migrate to the municipality, including Igorots and Ifugaos from the hinterlands.

Geography

Barangays
Ramon is politically subdivided into barangays. These barangays are headed by elected officials: Barangay Captain, Barangay Council, whose members are called Barangay Councilors. All are elected every three years.

Climate

Demographics

Economy 

Endowed with prime agricultural lands, the majority of its inhabitants derive their income from agriculture. Ramon ranks among the top rice-producing towns of Isabela alongside the towns of Alicia and San Mateo.

The northern border of Ramon is the Magat River that provides power to national grid though the Magat Dam.  The dam is a major employer in Barangay General Aguinaldo and has the works buildings and staff compounds situated there also. An undeveloped airport is in the area next to the river.

Ramon functions as a satellite town of Santiago City, a major growth center in southern Isabela.  The Magat River Multi-purpose project, likewise, provides the municipality economic and social gains brought about by the influx of technological advancements like irrigation and electric power.

Culture
Since 1948, Ramon was a mission of Santiago. It was 1978 that Ramon had a resident priest and it was only March 28, 1981, that then Bishop Miguel G. Purugganan, canonically erected this town into the status of a parish with Fr. Conrad Blanchet, MS as its first official parish priest.

Former Bishop Sergio L. Utleg, D.D., the Ordinary of the Diocese of Ilagan (now the Archbishop of the Archdiocese of Tuguegarao), offered the Parish of San Roque to remain under the "in perpetuum" care of the Missionaries of Our Lady of La Salette. The Provincial Superior, in deliberation with his Council, accepted the offer in its 94/04 decision in their meeting June 29, 2004. With this event, the Town of Ramon is now the only remaining parish entrusted to the Missionaries of Our Lady of La Salette.

Government

Local government
The municipality is governed by a mayor designated as its local chief executive and by a municipal council as its legislative body in accordance with the Local Government Code. The mayor, vice mayor, and the councilors are elected directly by the people through an election which is being held every three years.

Elected officials

Congress representation
Ramon, belonging to the third legislative district of the province of Isabela, currently represented by Hon. Ian Paul L. Dy.

Education
The Schools Division of Isabela governs the town's public education system. The division office is a field office of the DepEd in Cagayan Valley region. The office governs the public and private elementary and public and private high schools throughout the municipality.

References

External links
Municipal Profile at the National Competitiveness Council of the Philippines
Ramon at the Isabela Government Website
Local Governance Performance Management System
[ Philippine Standard Geographic Code]
Philippine Census Information
Municipality of Ramon
Local Governance Performance Management System

Municipalities of Isabela (province)